Feliks Jan Szczęsny Morawski (15 May 1818, in Rzeszów – 10 April 1898, in Stary Sącz) was a Polish historian, writer, painter and ethnographer.

Biography 

He studied painting with Jan Maszkowski in Lwów. Then, from 1839 to 1841, he attended the Academy of Fine Arts in Vienna. After returning to Lwów, he was appointed Curator of the art collections at the Ossolineum. During this time, he travelled throughout Galicia, drawing historical sites and objects. Later, he painted portraits and genre scenes, as well as some religious works.

Among his first writings were numerous articles and entries for the 28 volume set of Orgelbrand's Universal Encyclopedia, published from 1859 to 1868.

He also wrote dissertations on art, history and antiquity. His first monograph was on Stary Sącz: Sądecczyzna and was a fundamental source of information for researchers of the region. His other best known work was an historical novel, about the Bar Confederation. Some of his other titles are; Arianie polscy (Polish Arians), concerning the fate of the Polish Brethren, Pogórze Karpackie (The Carpathian Foothills), Pra-Sławianie i pra-Łotwa (Pre-Slavs and Pre-Latvians), Świat boży i życie na nim (God's World and Life on It), and Wyrazy fenickie w mowie polskiej (Phoenician Words in Polish Speech).

His interest in history made him a staunch patriot.

References

Selected works 
 Pobitna pod Rzeszowem : Powieść prawdziwa z czasów Konfederacji Barskiej z roku 1769 (Pobitna near Rzeszów: A True Novel from the Times of the Bar Confederation in 1769), 1864; reprinted by Pobitno-Wydawnictwo, 2004    (Google Books)
 Sądecczyzna, 2 Vols, self-published; Vol. 1 (1863) (Google Books), Vol.2, "Sądecczyzna During Jagiellonian Times" (1865), (Google Books)

Further reading 
 Henryk Barycz, Rzeszowianin Szczęsny Morawski 15.V.1818-10.IV.1898,  2nd ed., Stowarzyszenie Opieki nad Starym Cmentarzem im. Włodzimierza Kozło, 2002

External links

 "DOPÓKI SIŁ STARGANYCH STARCZY" by Agata Tobiasz (Biography, works and an appreciation)
 A selection his works @ Polona
 "Szczęsny-Morawski – omnibus z Rzeszowa" @ Niedziela

1818 births
1898 deaths
Polish painters
19th-century Polish historians
Polish male non-fiction writers
Polish ethnographers
Academy of Fine Arts Vienna alumni
People from Rzeszów